Zvončari ("bellmen") is the characteristic folk custom maintained in the region around Rijeka, Croatia. It was added to UNESCO's Representative List of the Intangible Cultural Heritage of Humanity in 2009.

The custom dates to Slavic pagan antiquity and remains typical for this region. The primary task of Zvončari is to scare away evil spirits of winter and to stir up a new spring-time cycle. During the Rijeka Carnival, Zvončari march from village to village throughout the region, following the same centuries-old route, making an extraordinary amount of noise, fueled in part by the wine provided by the locals' en route.

Description

The standard Zvončar costume includes white trousers, striped shirt, and a sheepskin throw. In their hands they hold a "balta" or "bačuka" — a stylized mace, and around the waist one or more big brass bells. Local legend claims that it was the Zvončari that scared away invading Tatars or Turks during the Ottoman conquest, with  shepherds doning masks on their heads, along with belted-on bells,  produced a deafening noise that scared the enemy away. From that time on, a mace became part of the standard equipment of Zvončari. 

The Zvončari participate regularly in the international Rijeka Carnival.

See also
Busójárás
Kurentovanje
Pre-Christian Alpine traditions
Rijeka carnival

References

External links

Zvončari of Halubje
Dondolaši of Grobnik
Rijeka Carnival

Croatian culture
Masterpieces of the Oral and Intangible Heritage of Humanity
Ritual animal disguise
Culture in Rijeka
Slavic carnival